Paul Bannon is a Gaelic footballer who plays for his local club Athlone and for the Westmeath county team.

He helped Westmeath to gain promotion to Division 1 in 2006 & 2008.

References

Year of birth missing (living people)
Living people
Athlone Gaelic footballers
Westmeath inter-county Gaelic footballers